Port Edward is a small resort town situated on the south coast of KwaZulu-Natal in South Africa. It lies north of the Mtamvuna Gorge which includes the Mtamvuna River and is the border between KwaZulu-Natal and the Eastern Cape. It is situated on the R61 road (future N2 Wild Coast Toll Route) between Port Shepstone and Lusikisiki.

History 
In 1831 there was a crisis between the settlers in Port Natal (Durban) and Dingane, the Zulu king. Some settlers boarded a ship that was in the harbour and the others, including Henry Francis Fynn and his family, fled down the coast. The Zulu warriors caught up with them where Port Edward is today and massacred the fleeing settlers, which included local tribespeople of Langeni, on a hill called Isandlundlu (in English, shaped like a hut). The place has been known ever since as Tragedy Hill and its slopes are still littered with the bones of the victims.

In 1552, the Portuguese carrick "Sao Joao" ran aground at Port Edward and this is the first time in recorded history that peoples from Europe met peoples from South Africa.

In 1878, the ship "The Ivy" ran aground on Leisure Bay area beach.

In 1925, the area was partly owned by TK Pringle, and he named the inland portion Banner Rest as this was where he wished to "strike his banner". The village was laid out and was named Port Edward in honour of the Prince of Wales, who later became King Edward VIII.

The first holiday cottage in Port Edward was a shack built among the sand dunes in the early days by transport rider Edward Stafford. Unaware of their motility, however, he was surprised and dismayed to see his fine creation swallowed up.  The area was subjected to several name changes as property was bought and sold, but the practice came to an end in 1952 when the town of Port Edward was ceremoniously dedicated to the then Prince of Wales.

Geography

Location
Port Edward lies on the southernmost part of KwaZulu-Natal and lies north of the Mtamvuna River which is the border between KwaZulu-Natal and the Eastern Cape, south of Southbroom and west of the Indian Ocean. The town is positioned along the R61 (future N2 Wild Coast Toll Route) leading to Mthatha to the west and Durban to the north-east.

The coastline between Port Edward and Hibberdene to the north is popularly known as the Hibiscus Coast because of its lush sub-tropical gardens.

Suburbs
Port Edward's greater or suburban area stretches from Palm Beach in the north to Rennies Beach in the south.

Banners Rest
Black Rock
Doc Wilson Point
Ekubo Coastal Estate
Glenmore
Ivy Beach
Leisure Bay
Leisure Crest
Meadowbrook
Munster
North Sand Bluff
Palm Beach
Rennies Beach 
Rocklands
Salmon Bay
Three Hills

Tourism
Port Edward is a tourist resort for seasonal visitors from more affluent regions of South Africa.

There are many tourist seasons that influence Port Edward but the most significant is the Christmas/ New Year period spanning from early December to mid-January. Port Edward's Silver Beach hosts an annual New Year's Eve party frequented by youths whilst on New Year's Day itself, families populate the beach for continued celebrations. 

Holiday accommodation is a particularly important source of income for the region throughout the year.

Beaches
Beaches in the greater Port Edward area include:
 Black Rock Beach
 Dassie Beach
 Glenmore Beach
 Ivy Beach
 Kidds Beach
 Leisure Beach
 Munster Beach
 Palm Beach
 Port Edward Main Beach: There is a ski boat launch facility at the main beach and it is also home to South Africa's longest supertube.
 Portobello Beach
 Rennies Beach
 Salmon Bay Beach
 Silver Beach: This beach is a popular fishing destination and fishing is one of the most popular sports in Port Edward.
 Spiros Rocks Beach
 T.O. Beach/Strand

Attractions
 Beaver Creek Coffee Estate is a café on Izingolweni Road. It also offers visitors a daily tour of the distinctive flavours of the world's coffee regions and how the coffee production works.
 Red Desert Nature Conservation Reserve is a national heritage site and is reputed to be the smallest desert in the world with a width of just 200m, and is also used for hiking and mountain biking through the extra-terrestrial terrain.
 Tragedy Hill is a sightseeing spot overlooking Silver Beach. It was named after an massacre whereby Zulu warriors massacred the family of pioneer Henry Flynn due to confusion over stolen cattle. The heartbroken Zulu King ordered the man who started the rumour to be executed by one of the surviving settlers who was given 5 heads of cattle as a reward.
 Umtamvuna Nature Reserve is a nature reserve located on the banks of the Mtamvuna River on the outskirts of Port Edward
 Wild Coast Sun is a casino and resort located on the opposite bank of the Mtamvuna River. It includes an 18-hole golf course and the famous Wild Waves Water Park which offers a variety of water sports.

Sardine Run
Another main season coincides with the Sardine run natural phenomenon usually occurring from late May to mid-July.

Economy
Recently large retail franchises Boxer Superstores and Shoprite Holdings have shown interest in Port Edward. With the local economy growing, the town is set for a bright future.

Schools
There are various small schools in Port Edward, some consisting of only 50+ children; however the most popular of these schools is Port Edward Primary School.

Golf
The only golf course in Port Edward is the Port Edward Country Club which is a 9-hole golf course. Surrounding 18-hole golf courses include Wild Coast Sun, San Lameer, Southbroom Golf Club, Margate Country Club, Port Shepstone Country Club, Umdoni Park and Selborne which are highly ranked by both Golf Digest and The Compleat Golfer.

Transport

Air
The nearest airport is the Margate Airport about 32 km north-east of Port Edward in Margate. This airport offers one scheduled direct route to Johannesburg operated by CemAir. The nearest international airport is the King Shaka International Airport (KSIA) which is north of Durban and is 196 km north-east of Port Edward. KSIA offers regional flights to Southern Africa, intercontinental flights to Europe and Asia as well as many domestic flights.

Road
Port Edward is located on the R61 which is a regional route connecting to Port Shepstone via Southbroom, Ramsgate, Margate and Shelly Beach in the north and Beaufort West via Bizana, Mthatha, Port St. Johns and Komani in the south. The R61 meets the N2 in Port Shepstone and the N2 further connects to Durban and Kokstad.

The Izingolweni Road is a small road that connects to Izingolweni and is one of the alternatives for people traveling to Port Edward via the N2 and don't want to encounter with the Oribi Toll Plaza in Port Shepstone.

See also
Black December

References

KwaZulu-Natal South Coast

External links
 Travel Guide to Port Edward
 360 degree Virtual Tour of Glenmore Beach
 Holiday Accommodation around Port Edward

Populated places in the Ray Nkonyeni Local Municipality
Populated coastal places in South Africa